Guibéroua is a town in south-central Ivory Coast. It is a sub-prefecture and commune of Gagnoa Department in Gôh Region, Gôh-Djiboua District.

Climate

References

Sub-prefectures of Gôh
Communes of Gôh